This article lists the oldest extant architectural practices in the world. Very few architectural practices are still operating whose foundation pre-dates the beginning of the 20th C and it would not be unreasonable to conclude that any practice that was founded in the 18th or 19th C should be listed as amongst the oldest surviving architectural firms around the globe. In order to qualify for the list a practice must:
 be predominantly an architectural practice, designing and constructing buildings and like structures
 be registered in their home territory as architects or architectural designers
 be operating continuously from the date of foundation, albeit a change of names or ownership is likely over intervening centuries
 be evidenced by relevant authoritative sources

18th century

19th century

References

Architecture lists